Old & In the Way is the self-titled first album by the bluegrass band Old & In the Way. It was recorded 8 October 1973 at the Boarding House in San Francisco by Owsley Stanley and Vickie Babcock utilizing eight microphones (four per channel) mixed live onto a stereo Nagra tape recorder.  The caricature album cover was illustrated by Greg Irons.  It was, for many years, the top selling bluegrass album of all time. Eventually, however, the soundtrack album for O Brother, Where Art Thou surpassed its sales.

Critical reception

On AllMusic, Peter J. D'Angelo said, "Soaring multi-part harmonies; fiddle, guitar, banjo, bass, and mandolin lines that seamlessly intertwine with a good-time feel; and exceptionally solid musicianship round out the ten-track effort.... This is the sound of purists re-creating the music they grew up with and it's both enjoyable and inspiring to listen to."

Track listing
 "Pig in a Pen" (Traditional) – 2:53
 "Midnight Moonlight" (Peter Rowan) – 6:17
 "Old and In the Way" (David Grisman) – 3:05
 "Knockin' on Your Door" (Traditional) – 3:36
 "The Hobo Song" (Jack Bonus) – 5:05
 "Panama Red" (Peter Rowan) – 2:57
 "Wild Horses" (Mick Jagger, Keith Richards) – 4:19
 "Kissimmee Kid" (Vassar Clements) – 3:32
 "White Dove" (Carter Stanley) – 4:45
 "Land of the Navajo" (Peter Rowan) – 6:19

Personnel

Old & In the Way
 Vassar Clements – fiddle
 Jerry Garcia – banjo, vocals
 David Grisman – mandolin, vocals
 John Kahn – acoustic bass
 Peter Rowan – guitar, vocals

Production
 Recording engineers – Owsley Stanley, Vickie Babcock
 Producer, mixing – David Grisman
 Editing – David Grisman, Owsley Stanley
 Sleeve illustration – Greg Irons
 Sleeve layout – Raymond Simone

Notes

Old & In the Way live albums
1975 debut albums
David Grisman live albums
1975 live albums